In gay slang, queen is a term used to refer to a flamboyant or effeminate gay man. The term can either be pejorative or celebrated as a type of self-identification.

History
In 1951, Karl Bowman, former president of the American Psychiatric Association, described patients who were called queens, in a report to the California State Legislature:

Such individuals in the 20th century would later be commonly termed transsexuals.

Related terms

Drag queen

A drag queen is a person, usually male,  who uses drag clothing and makeup to imitate and often exaggerate female gender signifiers and gender roles for entertainment purposes. Historically, most drag queens have been men dressing as women. In modern times, drag queens are associated with gay men and gay culture, but they can be of any gender and sexual identity.

People partake in the activity of doing drag for reasons ranging from self-expression to mainstream performance.Or to simply have fun. Drag shows frequently include lip-syncing, live singing, and dancing. They occur at events like gay pride parades and drag pageants and in venues such as cabarets and nightclubs. Drag queens vary by type, culture, and dedication, from professionals who star in films to people who do drag only occasionally.

Generally, drag queens dress in a female gender role, often exaggerating certain characteristics for comic, dramatic or satirical effect. Other drag performers include drag kings, who are women who perform in male roles, faux queens, who are women who dress in an exaggerated style to emulate drag queens and faux kings, who are men who dress to impersonate drag kings. A bedroom queen is a drag queen who mainly does their drag at home in the bedroom rather than publicly.

The term drag queen usually refers to people who dress in drag for the purpose of performing, whether singing or lip-synching, dancing, participating in events such as gay pride parades, drag pageants, or at venues such as cabarets and discotheques. Alongside traditional drag work such as shows and performances, many drag queens engage in 'mix-and-mingle' or hosting work at night clubs or at private parties/events.
Drag is a part of Western gay culture; it is often noted that the Stonewall riots on June 27, 1969 in New York City were inspired and led by drag queens and, in part for this reason, drag queens remain a tradition at pride events. Prominent drag queens in the gay community of a city often serve as official or unofficial spokespersons, hosts or emcees, fund-raisers, chroniclers and community leaders.

Rice queen

A rice queen is a gay male who prefers or exclusively dates East Asian men. The term is considered gay slang and depending on the context, may be considered derogatory and offensive internationally, which is a new degree of offensive.

Sticky rice refers to Asian males who prefer other Asian males.

The term rice king is used to describe heterosexual males who seek Asian women.

Yellow fever denotes the attraction certain non-Asian individuals may have for Asian men or women.

Bean queen

Bean queen or rice and bean queen are terms used in the English-speaking gay community to refer to a person, usually a white male, who is primarily attracted to Hispanic and Latino males. One source describes these as "Gay men who are attracted to gentlemen of the Latino flava."

The term is probably derived from the better-established term "rice queen", substituting the rice that forms the basis of the Asian diet with the beans or rice and beans popular throughout Central America, South America and the Caribbean. Other food-based variations such as taco queen, salsa queen and so on are heard occasionally.

Refried beans refers to Hispanic and Latino men who prefer other Hispanic and Latino men.

Much less frequently, these terms are used to describe gay Latino males themselves.

Mitten queen
One who prefers to masturbate partners.

Fire queen
One who likes to burn partners with cigarettes and/or vice versa.

Size queen

A size queen is a gay male who prefers or exclusively dates or has sex with men who have large penises or large build.

Gym queen

Gym queen refers to gay men who are into bodybuilding and working out either to bulk up and may include steroid use or those looking for a more lithe physique.  Although body building and male physique magazines were popular before the 1970s, the Castro clone look — workboots, jeans, tight white T-shirt, shorter well-kept hair, and a well-muscled physique — became widely known and emulated in the 1970s and 1980s, replacing the hippie artistic constructs and fashions.

Show queen
According to Charles Isherwood in The New York Times, "Show queen is, of course, the technical term for a person, of either gender and any sexual orientation, who is inordinately fond of Broadway musicals." Although a "reviled" gay stereotype in the past, many LGBT activists influenced by queer politics have sought to reclaim the stereotype in a positive way.

In literature
An early example of this usage of the word "queen" in modern mainstream literature occurs in the 1933 novel The Young and the Evil by Charles Henri Ford and Parker Tyler: "While waiting Karel wet his hair and put his handkerchief smeared with mascara behind a pipe. You still look like a queen Frederick said..."

In music
"Artificial Energy", the opening track from The Byrds' 1968 album The Notorious Byrd Brothers is an upbeat song about the effects of amphetamine use, but the lyrics take an unexpected dark turn at the end when the narrator reveals that he's landed "in jail 'cause [he] killed a queen."

The Pink Floyd song from 1979 album The Wall, "Waiting for the Worms", contains the line "Waiting, for the queens and the coons and the reds and the Jews".
The Kinks song from 1970, "Top of the Pops", contains the line "I've been invited to a dinner with a prominent queen..." and may be one of the earliest recorded examples of this usage. Their 1966 song "Little Miss Queen of Darkness" may be an even earlier reference, though more ambiguous in its possible description of a drag queen "accidentally met" in a discotheque, whose "false eyelashes/ were not much of a disguise..." and who was "not all that it might seem..."

The name of famous British rock group, Queen, can be seen as a reference to LGBT slang. According to singer Freddie Mercury, he "was certainly aware of the gay connotations" when suggesting the name, although, as he admitted, "that was just one facet of it".

See also

 LGBT slang

References

External links
 Spanish language glossary of gay terms. Mainly in Spanish but with English definitions.

Gay effeminacy
Gender roles in the LGBT community
Homophobic slurs
LGBT slang
Stereotypes of LGBT people
English words

ca:Ploma (LGBT)
de:Tunte